Wassim Keddari Boulif (born 3 February 2005), commonly known as Simo, is a professional footballer who plays as a central defender for RCD Espanyol and the Spain national under-19 football team.

Club career
Born in Terrassa, Barcelona, Catalonia, Simo joined RCD Espanyol's youth setup in 2016, from hometown side UFB Jàbac Terrassa. On 3 July 2021, while still a youth, he signed a five-year contract with the club.

Simo made his senior debut with the reserves on 12 December 2021, starting in a 4–1 Segunda División RFEF away routing of SD Ejea. He scored his first goal the following 5 February, netting a last-minute equalizer in a 3–3 draw at CF Badalona.

Simo made his first team – and La Liga – debut on 4 September 2022, coming on as a second-half substitute for Keidi Bare in a 1–0 away success over Athletic Bilbao.

References

External links
 
 

2005 births
Living people
Footballers from Terrassa
Spanish people of Algerian descent
Spanish footballers
Algerian footballers
Association football defenders
La Liga players
Segunda Federación players
RCD Espanyol B footballers
RCD Espanyol footballers
Algeria youth international footballers
Spain youth international footballers